John Clarke was an English professional footballer who played as a centre-forward in the Football League for Grimsby Town.

References

Year of birth missing
Year of death missing
People from Annfield Plain
Footballers from County Durham
English footballers
Association football forwards
Middlesbrough F.C. players
Brentford F.C. players
Durham City A.F.C. players
Grimsby Town F.C. players
Leadgate Park F.C. players
Coventry City F.C. players
English Football League players